The House of Kalckreuth is the name of an ancient and important German noble family.

History 
The family was first mentioned in a document on December 16, 1284 with Heinricus dictus de Kalcruthe on Lyce near Dresden . Conrad von Kalckreuth appears in a document on December 6, 1286. In early 14th century, several lines appeared that spread widely throughout Silesia, but also in Lusatia, Brandenburg, Mecklenburg and Poland.

Title 
Family members were awarded with the title of Baron in 1678 . Brothers Hans Ernst (1728-1792) and Friedrich Adolf, Count von Kalckreuth, who were raised to the Prussian count status in 1786 , founded the two lines of the comital family.

Notable members 
Friedrich Adolf, Count von Kalckreuth (1737–1818), Prussian field marshal
Count Stanislaus von Kalckreuth (1820–1894), German landscape painter
Count Leopold von Kalckreuth (1855–1928), German Impressionist painter
Countess Maria von Kalckreuth (1857-1897), German painter
Countess Tamara von Kalckreuth (born 1972), German television personality, wife of Count Alexander von Kalckreuth
Countess Elfie von Kalckreuth (Eva Anthes), actress

 
German noble families